The Bride Ship is the third studio album by Crime & the City Solution, released on July 11, 1989 through Mute Records.

Track listing

Personnel 
'''Crime & the City Solution
Bronwyn Adams – violin
Simon Bonney – vocals
Chrislo Haas – guitar, synthesizer
Alexander Hacke – guitar
Mick Harvey – drums, piano
Thomas Stern – bass guitar
Production and additional personnel
Bleddyn Butcher – photography
Crime & the City Solution – mixing
Ralph Droge – trombone
Peter Gruchot – photography
David Heilmann – engineering
Gareth Jones – production, mixing
Miles Standish – photography
Victor Van Vugt – engineering, mixing

References

External links 
 

1989 albums
Albums produced by Gareth Jones (music producer)
Crime & the City Solution albums
Mute Records albums